Sammy Lunn was a South Australian fundraiser and philanthropist who was acclaimed in his state as a fundraiser for Australian Service-men who served during World War I. Lunn was also an active member of the Port Adelaide Football Club.

Lunn was a business man who operated as an ice cream vendor. Lunn would often sell ice cream from his van in the beachside suburb of Semaphore.

In 1920 Lunn was awarded an M.B.E. in recognition of his support of Australian service-men. An example of his support included providing 12,000 Digger with five shillings deriving from his fund-raising efforts.

Lunn would attend SANFL football matches as part of his fundraising efforts, in particular for Port Adelaide where he wore that team's lace-up guernsey and shouted rhymes and parodies to the amusement of spectators.

When he died, many shops in South Australia closed during his funeral procession.

Publications 

 Bell, Clarrie (1990) 'Sammy Lunn (1865-1923): The Diggers' Pal'  Historical Society of Woodville
Lunn, Samuel (1914) '''][https://catalogue.nla.gov.au/Record/2651546 The War Fund''' Scrymgour & Sons.

References

Sports spectators
Australian Members of the Order of the British Empire
1864 births
1923 deaths
Australian businesspeople
Australian food industry businesspeople